Camryn Magness (born July 14, 1999), known publicly as Camryn, is an American pop singer and actress from Denver, Colorado. She first gained attention through a series of YouTube videos she posted in 2010, which led to her first United States tour alongside Cody Simpson and Greyson Chance. Camryn then joined One Direction on their Up All Night Tour in 2011 and was also asked to rejoin One Direction for 63 sold-out shows on their 2013 Take Me Home Tour in Europe. In 2016, Camryn was direct support for Fifth Harmony on their European 7/27 Tour.

Background
She was born in Denver, Colorado and is the granddaughter of Celestial Seasonings founder Mo Siegel. In 2007, eight-year-old Camryn volunteered at the Denver Rescue Mission's annual Christmas Banquet.

Career

2008–2011: Career beginnings
In late 2008, Camryn was signed to 5280 Media and moved to Los Angeles. Throughout 2009, Camryn wrote and recorded her first single, "Wait and See" with Frank Shooflar of the band Blessed by a Broken Heart and longtime family friend Lennon Murphy. The song was subsequently mixed by Brian Malouf (Michael Jackson, Pink, Madonna). John Schultz handpicked "Wait and See" to serve as the title track in the 2011 film adaptation of the bestselling children's book Judy Moody and the Not Bummer Summer. The film was produced by Smokewood Entertainment. Additionally the music video for "Wait and See" included Family Matters star and Dancing with the Stars contestant Jaleel White.

In April 2011, it was announced that Camryn had joined Cody Simpson and Greyson Chance on their Waiting 4U Tour. The tour stopped at venues across the United States and hit major markets including Chicago, New York City and Los Angeles. During the summer of 2011, Camryn toured the Midwestern United States with Allstar Weekend.

In fall 2011, Camryn's management began seeking out new touring opportunities for her and soon realized there weren't any family-friendly ones to join. As a result, Camryns Back 2 School Tour was launched on November 7 in La Quinta, California. Camryn spent the next several months touring the United States, performing at nearly 100 schools and for over 80,000 students. During this time, she also performed her new single "Set the Night on Fire" on dozens of television and radio programs.

2012: Breakthrough with 'Now or Never' and One Direction Tour
Camryn's second single, "Set the Night on Fire", was also written by the Camryn, Frank Schooflar and Lennon Murphy trio and produced by Spider and Lennon Murphy. The single was mixed by industry veteran Tony Maserati, and debuted on Top 40 radio in the United States in May 2012. The song steadily gained airplay on various stations, including the nationally syndicated Sirius XM Top 20 on 20 and in major markets like Las Vegas and San Francisco.

On February 16, 2012, Camryn rejoined former tourmate Greyson Chance on his arena tour in Asia. The tour kicked off in Kuala Lumpur, Malaysia on April 17, 2012. In the days leading up to the concert she made many radio appearances; she also appeared on The 8TV Quickie late-night television program. The following day, Camryn performed at the Festive Grand Theatre in Singapore. Camryn then made stops at Jitec Hall in Jakarta and the Smart Araneta Coliseum in Manila before returning to Los Angeles.

Just one month later, Camryn hit the road with boy band One Direction on their Up All Night Tour of the United States. On the tour's first night out, Camryn debuted a new song, "Now or Never", and received favorable reviews for her performances in each city.

In fall 2012, Camryn joined with brands Tilly's and High School Nation to headline a Warped Tour style festival with The Rocket Summer, BLUSH, PK Band (Red Bull Records) and The Stamps. The Tilly's High School Nation tour hit major markets across California and raised money to help keep the arts in the classroom. The event included local vendors as well as booths from Jamba Juice, LA Music Academy, Brooks Institute, FIDM, Music Saves Lives, The Canvas Foundation, Academy of Art University, American Musical and Dramatic Academy as well as staging and concert production from Ernie Ball. During this time, Camryn invited local radio stations and TV crews to the concerts, and received many reviews which called her performance, "remarkable".

Camryn's third single, "Now or Never", was debuted exclusively on the One Direction tour in Summer 2012 and impacted at Top 40 Radio in the United States on October 16, 2012. Within the first week of impacting at radio, Camryn had become the #1 Most Added Independent Artist on the chart, which included adds across Top 40, Rhythmic and Adult Contemporary stations. On November 15, 2012, MTV Buzzworthy debuted her music video for 'Now or Never' on the blog, which trended to the homepage of MTV.com. Additionally, this grabbed the attention of Ryan Seacrest of American Top 40 who posted the video while commenting on the success of her career in such a short time. During her off time, Camryn visited radio stations across the United States to perform and promote "Now or Never".

After releasing her One Direction tour exclusive single 'Now or Never' and becoming the #1 Most Added Independent Artist at Top 40 radio for a second time, Camryn was asked to rejoin One Direction for the remainder of their U.S. tour dates for 2012. After playing 9 sold-out shows with them at this point, One Direction invited Camryn back to open for them on 63 sold-out shows on their 2013 European Take Me Home Tour.

2013: Take Me Home Tour and 'Lovesick' 
Camryn started the year by touring with One Direction for 63 sold-out arena concerts on the Take Me Home Tour, making 37 stops all across the United Kingdom before hitting major markets in Europe over a 4-month period. Camryn was also joined by openers 5 Seconds of Summer for the 37 United Kingdom tour dates.

While on tour, Camryn showcased her fourth single 'Lovesick', performing it for radio stations and on TV shows across the continent. The largest audience was on May 8, 2013, when Camryn performed for over 36,000 people at the Stockholm Friends Arena in Sweden. In Verona, Italy, on May 19, Camryn was caught on top of the historic Arena di Verona with the One Direction boys on syndicated tabloid TMZ.

After returning to Los Angeles Camryn announced on Twitter that her next single would be "Lovesick". The single is expected to be released in October 2013 while it climbs Top 40 and Rhythmic Radio in the United States.

2016: "Machines"
Camryn released an "anthemic" single entitled "Machines" on March 25, 2016 The video for the song premiered exclusively via Fuse and fuse.tv. She was also a supporting act for Fifth Harmony on several stops of their European leg of the 7/27 Tour.

Discography
2017: Glow
 2016: Machines
 2014: Supermad
 2014: Like Madonna
 2013: Lovesick
 2012: Now or Never
 2012: Now or Never Remix
 2011: Set the Night on Fire
 2011: Summer
 2010: Wait and See
Source:
Source:

Tours
 2011: Waiting 4U Tour
 2011: North America Tour w/ Allstar Weekend
 2011-12: Back 2 School Tour
 2012: Greyson Chance Asia Tour
 2012: One Direction Up All Night Tour
 2012: Tilly's High School Nation Tour
 2013: One Direction Take Me Home Tour (63 shows in Europe)
 2016: Fifth Harmony The 7/27 Tour (European dates)

References

External links

 
 

1999 births
American child actresses
American child singers
American women pop singers
Child pop musicians
Living people
Actresses from Denver
Singers from Denver
21st-century American women singers
21st-century American singers